The Linear Scaffold is the debut studio album by Norwegian avant-garde metal band Solefald. It was released in 1997, through Avantgarde Records.

The cover art features Odd Nerdrum's 1986 painting Return of the Sun.

Track listing 
All Lyrics by Cornelius Jakhelln, except where noted.  All Music by Solefald.
 "Jernlov" – 3:48 (Jakhelln/Lazare Nedlund)
 "Philosophical Revolt" – 5:45
 "Red View" – 5:20 (Jakhelln/Nedlund)
 "Floating Magenta" – 1:42 (Jakhelln/Nedlund)
 "The Macho Vehicle" – 5:00
 "Countryside Bohemians" – 5:33
 "Tequila Sunrise" – 4:17
 "When the Moon Is on the Wave" – 7:24 (lyrics from a poem written by Lord Byron)

Critical reception 

AllMusic chose the album as an "album pick" in their retrospective review, commenting that the album "showed right off the bat that they were a band with their own sound and vision."  The album was featured on Terrorizer's "The Great Black Metal Albums Of All Time", with a number 30 showing.  Reviewer James "Harry" Hinchliffe called it "a bold and wonderfully pretentious re-interpretation of BM, inspired as much by Sartre as Satan and careening dizzyingly between devastatingly concise black metal and poppy, blissed-out choruses."

Personnel 
As noted in liner notes
Cornelius: Iron Law Screams, Linear Scaffold Strings, Bass
Lazare: Melovoice, Macrocosmic Keys, Tornado Beats

Production
Arranged by Solefald
Produced, Recorded & Mixed by Roald Råsberg
Mastered by Solefald & Morten Lund

References 

Solefald albums
1997 albums
Avantgarde Music albums